Star Portraits with Rolf Harris is a BBC television series that ran for three seasons from 2004-07. The show features three artists who each paint a picture of a celebrity, and then the celebrity gets to choose which paintings to keep. It was presented by now-disgraced Australian entertainer Rolf Harris.

Episodes

Series One (2004) 
The episodes of Series One were watched by 5 million viewers, the most that any art programme has had in the United Kingdom. The celebrities painted were:
 Michael Parkinson, CBE,  TV presenter
 Charlie Dimmock, Gardening Expert and TV Presenter
 David Dickinson, Antique Expert and TV Presenter
 Meera Syal, Actress, Writer, Journalist

Series Two (2005) 
 Cilla Black, Singer and Television Presenter
 Adrian Edmondson, Comedian and Writer
 Dr Mo Mowlam, Member of Parliament 
 Richard Wilson, Actor

Series Three (2007) 
 Dame Barbara Windsor, Actress
 Dame Kelly Holmes, Athlete
 Bill Oddie OBE, Comedian, Presenter and Conservationist

The Exhibitions 
After each series was over, the paintings went on a tour of Britain.

See also
Rolf Harris
Rolf on Art

External links
 

Rolf Harris

2004 British television series debuts
2007 British television series endings
Arts in the United Kingdom
BBC Television shows
English-language television shows
Television series about art